Learnit Institute of Business and Technology was an institute of business, finance, computer and information technology in Dar es Salaam, Tanzania, having affiliations with UK leading institutions and universities. The institute trains over 1000 students every year and has had over 8000 graduates since 1993.

History and location 
The college started its operations in Tanzania in 1993 under the umbrella of Soft-Tech Consultants Ltd as pioneers in the field of information and communication technology (ICT) and its mission today is to empower through ICT. It is registered and fully accredited by the National Council for Technical Education. The location of the college is in the Oasis Office Park building located at the Oysterbay area.

Accreditation 
Learnit is accredited with the following four bodies:-

National Council for Technical Education (NACTE) Tanzania
NCC Education (NCC) United Kingdom
University of Greenwich (UoG) United Kingdom

External links 
Official website

References 

Universities and colleges in Tanzania
1993 establishments in Tanzania
Educational institutions established in 1993